Riley Moss (born March 3, 2000) is an American football cornerback for the Iowa Hawkeyes.

Early life and high school career
Moss grew up in Ankeny, Iowa and attended Ankeny Centennial High School, where he played football and ran track. He originally committed to play college football at North Dakota State entering his senior season. As a senior, Moss caught six passes for 167 and a touchdown on offense and had 29 tackles and an interception on defense. Moss decommitted from North Dakota State and committed to play at Iowa after receiving a late offer.

College career
Moss joined the Iowa Hawkeyes as a blue-shirt recruit and was awarded a scholarship after the end of his freshman season. He was named the Big Ten Conference freshman of the week after intercepting two passes against Minnesota. As a junior, Moss had 43 tackles with four passes broken up and two interceptions, one of which he returned for a touchdown, and was an honorable mention All-Big Ten selection. He returned two interceptions for touchdowns against Indiana in the first game of his senior season. Moss missed three games after suffering a torn posterior cruciate ligament in Iowa's 23-20 win over fourth-ranked Penn State.

References

External links
Iowa Hawkeyes bio

2000 births
Living people
Players of American football from Iowa
American football cornerbacks
Iowa Hawkeyes football players
People from Ankeny, Iowa